AFK or afk may refer to:

Songs 

 "AFK", a song on the 2004 album Summer in Abaddon by Pinback
 "AFK", a song on the 2015 album Glyptothek by Momus

Transportation 

 Nebraska City Municipal Airport (FAA LID), United States
 Angamaly railway station (station code), India
 Ashford International railway station (station code), United Kingdom

Other uses 

 Away from keyboard, a phrase used in video games
 Nanubae language (of which the ISO 639-3 code is "afk")

See also 

 TPB AFK (TPB AFK: The Pirate Bay Away From Keyboard), a 2013 documentary film